Conference League may refer to
 UEFA Europa Conference League, the third tier of European association football competition
 National Conference League, the top English amateur rugby league competition
 Conference League South, an amateur rugby league competition in England
 Conference League (speedway), a speedway division in the UK from 1996-2008
 The Football Conference, the previous name for the National League, the fifth and sixth tiers of the English association football pyramid

See also
 Conference League Cup
 Athletic conference